Castelnuovo Bozzente is a comune (municipality) in the Province of Como in the Italian region of Lombardy, about  northwest of Milan and  southwest of Como.

Castelnuovo Bozzente borders the following municipalities: Appiano Gentile, Beregazzo con Figliaro, Binago, Tradate, Venegono Inferiore.

Demographic evolution

References

Cities and towns in Lombardy